was a town located in Kumage District, Yamaguchi Prefecture, Japan. Yamato was established as a village in 1943, and promoted to a town in 1971.

As of 2003, the town had an estimated population of 8,057 and a density of 251.08 persons per km2. The total area was 32.09 km2.

On October 4, 2004, Yamato was merged into the expanded city of Hikari and no longer exists as an independent municipality.

External links
Yamato official website of Hikari city (in Japanese)

Dissolved municipalities of Yamaguchi Prefecture